The Browning Hi-Power is a single-action, semi-automatic pistol available in the 9×19mm Parabellum and .40 S&W calibers. It was based on a design by American firearms inventor John Browning, and completed by Dieudonné Saive at FN Herstal. Browning died in 1926, several years before the design was finalized. FN Herstal named it the "High Power" in allusion to the 13-round magazine capacity, almost twice that of other designs at the time, such as the Luger or Colt M1911.

During World War II, Belgium was occupied by Nazi Germany and the FN factory was used by the Wehrmacht to build the pistols for their military, under the designation "9mm Pistole 640(b)". FN Herstal continued to build guns for the Allied forces by moving their production line to a John Inglis and Company plant in Canada, where the name was changed to "Hi Power". The name change was kept even after production returned to Belgium. The pistol is often referred to as an HP or BHP, and the terms P-35 and HP-35 are also used, based on the introduction of the pistol in 1935. Other names include GP (for the French term, "Grande Puissance") or BAP (Browning Automatic Pistol). The Hi-Power is one of the most widely used military pistols in history, having been used by the armed forces of over 50 countries. Although most pistols were built in Belgium by FN Herstal, licensed and unlicensed copies were built around the world, in countries such as Argentina, Hungary, India, Bulgaria, and Israel.

After 82 years of continuous production, FN Herstal announced that the production of the Hi-Power would end, and it was discontinued in early 2018 by Browning Arms. From 2019 to 2022, with new Belgian Hi-Powers no longer being built, new clones were designed by various firearm companies to fill the void, including GİRSAN, TİSAŞ, and Springfield Armory, Inc. These new Hi-Power clones began competing with each other by offering new finishes, enhanced sights, redesigned hammers, beveled magazine wells, improved trigger, and increased magazine capacity.

In 2022, FN announced they would resume production of the Browning Hi-Power. The 2022 "FN High Power" incorporated a number of entirely new features such as a fully ambidextrous slide lock, simplified takedown method, enlarged ejection port, reversible magazine release, wider slide serrations, different colored finish offerings, and 17-round magazines. In contrast to popular belief, the new FN High Power might resemble a modern Hi-Power, but it is, in fact, a different design. One of the noticeable details is the lack of Browning-style locking lugs.

History

Development
The Browning Hi-Power was designed in response to a French military requirement for a new service pistol, the "Grand Rendement" (French for "high efficiency"), or alternatively Grande Puissance (literally "high power"). The French military required that:

 The gun must be compact.
 The magazine have a capacity of at least 10 rounds.
 The gun have a magazine disconnect device, an external hammer, and a positive safety.
 The gun be robust and simple to disassemble and reassemble.
 The gun be capable of killing a man at 50 metres.
 
This last criterion was seen to demand a caliber of 9 mm or larger, a bullet mass of around 8 grams (123.5 grains), and a muzzle velocity of 350 m/s (1148 ft/s). It was to accomplish all of this at a weight not exceeding 1 kg (2.2 lb).

FN commissioned John Browning to design a new military sidearm conforming to this specification. Browning had previously sold the rights to his successful M1911 U.S. Army automatic pistol to Colt's Patent Firearms, and was therefore forced to design an entirely new pistol while working around the M1911 patents. Browning built two different prototypes for the project in Utah and filed the patent for this pistol in the United States on 28 June 1923, granted on 22 February 1927. One was a simple blowback design, while the other was operated with a locked-breech recoil system. Both prototypes utilised the new staggered magazine design (by designer Dieudonné Saive) to increase capacity without unduly increasing the pistol's grip size or magazine length.

The locked breech design was selected for further development and testing. This model was striker-fired, and featured a double-stack magazine that held 16 rounds. The design was refined through several trials held by the Versailles Trial Commission.

In 1928, when the patents for the Colt Model 1911 had expired, Dieudonné Saive integrated many of the Colt's previously patented features into the Saive-Browning Model of that same year. This version featured the removable barrel bushing and take down sequence of the Colt 1911.

In 1929, as an effort to find an alternative solution to the long-ongoing French trials, and with a pistol that they considered by then to be good enough to stand on its own to find other potential clients, FN decided to announce the "Grand Rendement", incorporating a shortened 13-round magazine, for sale in their commercial catalogue. They hoped to find a military contract which would in turn help them finance a production line, essentially through the same process as their previous FN M1900 pistol.

By 1931, the Browning Hi-Power design incorporated the same 13-round magazine, a curved rear grip strap, and a barrel bushing that was integral to the slide assembly. The Belgian Army showed a definite interest and bought 1,000 pistols based on this prototype for field trials.

By 1934, the Hi-Power design was complete and ready to be produced. Ultimately, France decided not to adopt the pistol, instead selecting the conceptually similar but lower-capacity Modèle 1935 pistol. However, it was good enough to stand on its own as a service pistol for the Belgian Army and other clients. These would become the Grande Puissance, known as the High Power, in Belgium for military service in 1935 as the Browning P-35.

Military service and widespread use
Browning Hi-Power pistols were used during World War II by both Allied and Axis forces. After occupying Belgium in 1940, German forces took over the FN plant. German troops subsequently used the Hi-Power, having assigned it the designation Pistole 640(b) ("b" for belgisch, "Belgian"). Examples produced by FN in Belgium under German occupation bear German inspection and acceptance marks, or Waffenamts, such as WaA613. In German service, it was used mainly by Waffen-SS and Fallschirmjäger personnel.

High-Power pistols were also produced in Canada for Allied use, by John Inglis and Company in Toronto. The plans were sent from the FN factory to the UK when it became clear the Belgian plant would fall into German hands, enabling the Inglis factory to be tooled up for Hi-Power production for Allied use. Inglis produced two versions of the Hi-Power, one with an adjustable rear sight and detachable shoulder stock (primarily for a Nationalist Chinese contract) and one with a fixed rear sight. Production began in late 1944 and they were on issue by the March 1945 Operation Varsity airborne crossing of the Rhine into Germany. The pistol was popular with the British airborne forces as well as covert operations and commando groups such as the Special Operations Executive (SOE), the U.S. Office of Strategic Services (OSS), and the British Special Air Service (SAS) Regiment. Inglis High-Powers made for Commonwealth forces have the British designation 'Mk 1' or 'Mk 1*' and the manufacturer's details on the left of the slide. They were known in British and Commonwealth service as the 'Pistol No 2 Mk 1', or 'Pistol No 2 Mk 1*' where applicable. Serial numbers were 6 characters, the second being the letter 'T', e.g. 1T2345. Serial numbers on pistols for the Chinese contract instead used the letters 'CH', but otherwise followed the same format. When the Chinese contract was cancelled, all undelivered Chinese-style pistols were accepted by the Canadian military with designations of 'Pistol No 1 Mk 1' and 'Pistol No 1 Mk 1*'.

In the postwar period, Hi-Power production continued at the FN factory and as part of FN's product range, which included the FN FAL rifle and FN MAG general-purpose machine gun. It has been adopted as the standard service pistol by over 50 armies in 93 countries. At one time most NATO nations used it, and it was standard issue to forces throughout the British Commonwealth. It was manufactured under licence, or in some cases cloned, on several continents. Former Iraqi ruler Saddam Hussein often carried a Browning Hi-Power. Former Libyan ruler Muammar Gaddafi carried a gold-plated Hi-Power with his own face design on the left side of the grip which was waved around in the air by Libyan rebels after his death. A Hi-Power was used by Mehmet Ali Agca during the assassination attempt of Pope John Paul II in 1981.

Decline and resurgence

While the Hi-Power remains an excellent and iconic design, since the early 1990s it has been eclipsed somewhat by more modern designs which are often double-action with aluminum alloy frames and are manufactured using more modern methods. However, even to this day, the Hi-Power remains in service throughout the world. As of 2017, the MK1 version remained the standard service pistol of the Canadian Armed Forces, with the SIG Sauer P226 being issued to specialised units along with the SIG Sauer P225. The weapon is the standard sidearm of the Belgian Army, Indian Army, Indonesian Armed Forces, Australian Defence Force, Argentine Army, Luxembourg Armed Forces, Israel Police, and Venezuelan Army, among others. The Irish Army replaced its Browning Pistols (known popularly as BAPs, or Browning Automatic Pistols) with the Heckler & Koch USP in 2007. From 2013 the British Army is replacing the Browning with the polymer-framed Glock 17 Gen 4 pistol, due to concerns about weight and the external safety of the pistol.

In 2018, FN announced they would end production of the Mark III Hi-Power, which was expensive to produce and had been assembled in Portugal to cut costs. Early in that year, Browning officially ceased production of the Belgian Hi-Power for the first time since 1935. An unlicensed clone called the "Regent BR9" was produced in Turkey by TİSAŞ in 2019 and had gained some popularity now that authentic Hi-Powers were no longer being made and surplus Hi-Powers from other countries like Hungary and Argentina had dried up. The Regent BR9 design was more of a copy of the Mark I design, but did offer some modern design features, like a cerakote or stainless steel finish and Novak-style sights. In 2021, another Turkish company called GİRSAN began producing their own Hi-Power clone called the MCP35, imported by EAA. In 2021, American firearms company Springfield Armory announced their own Hi-Power clone, the SA-35. GİRSAN and Springfield Armory's clones began competing with each other by offering new design improvements that would help them compete in the oversaturated defensive handgun market. GİRSAN's MCP35 attempted to replicate the Mark III design as closely as possible, including the Belgian style ambidextrous thumb safety, Mark III style sights with a windage drift adjustable rear sight and dovetailed front sight and Mark III style black polymer grips. The MCP35 also retained the Belgian magazine disconnect safety. However, the MCP35 incorporated the original ring hammer design instead of the claw hammer design of the Mark III, and also incorporated some design elements to appeal to the modern shooter, such as a 15-round Mec-Gar magazine and cerakote finish.

The steady competition between the MCP35 and the SA-35 to make the original Hi-Power relevant in the current market stirred up a great interest among both Hi-Power fans and new shooters. On 18 January 2022, after a four year hiatus, FN announced they would resume production of the Browning Hi-Power, albeit with a number of upgraded features. FN named the 2022 redesign the "FN High Power" and incorporated a number of features to help it compete with the improved Hi-Power clones being made by GİRSAN and Springfield Armory. FN incorporated a number of changes that would make the classic Hi-Power design more modern and ergonomic. The most significant changes included opening up the top of the slide to increase the size of the ejection port to ensure reliable feeding and ejection, incorporating an ambidextrous slide lock and reversible magazine release, a completely different takedown that is faster and simpler, and redesigning the barrel and recoil spring. Other changes FN made include removing the magazine disconnect safety, adding an extended beavertail and redesigned hammer to eliminate the issue of hammer bite, several sets of redesigned grips, new sights compatible with the FN 509 dovetail pattern, wider slide serrations, different colored PVD or stainless steel finish offerings and 17 round magazines. The new FN High Powers will be made at FN's Columbia, South Carolina factory in the United States. At SHOT show 2022, GİRSAN announced new color offerings for the MCP35, including two-tone and gold, as well as the MCP35 "Match", which incorporated a number of designs intended to cater to target shooters, such as an integrated 1913 picatinny rail for accessories, ergonomic grips, a shorter hammer throw, beveled and flared magwell, a flat target trigger and raised target sights with a fiber optic front sight.

Design

The Browning Hi-Power has undergone continuous refinement by FN since its introduction. The pistols were originally made in two models: an "Ordinary Model" with fixed sights and an "Adjustable Rear Sight Model" with a tangent-type rear sight and a slotted grip for attaching a wooden shoulder stock. The adjustable sights are still available on commercial versions of the Hi-Power, although the shoulder stock mounts were discontinued during World War II. In 1962, the design was modified to replace the internal extractor with an external extractor, improving reliability.

Standard Hi-Powers are based on a single-action design. Unlike modern double-action semi-automatic pistols, the Hi-Power's trigger is not connected to the hammer. If a double-action pistol is carried with the hammer down with a round in the chamber and a loaded magazine installed, the shooter may fire the pistol either by simply squeezing the trigger or by pulling the hammer back to the cocked position and then squeezing the trigger. In contrast, a single-action pistol can only be fired with the hammer in the cocked position; this is generally done when a loaded magazine is inserted and the slide cycled by hand. In common with the M1911, the Hi-Power is therefore typically carried with the hammer cocked, a round in the chamber, and the safety catch on (a carry mode often called cocked and locked in the United States or "made ready" in the UK, or sometimes called condition one).

The Hi-Power, like many other Browning designs, operates on the short-recoil principle, where the barrel and slide initially recoil together until the barrel is unlocked from the slide by a cam arrangement. Unlike Browning's earlier Colt M1911 pistol, the barrel is not moved vertically by a toggling link, but instead by a hardened bar which crosses the frame under the barrel and contacts a slot under the chamber at the rearmost part of the barrel. The barrel and slide recoil together for a short distance, but as the slot engages the bar, the chamber and the rear of the barrel are drawn downward and stopped. The downward movement of the barrel disengages it from the slide, which continues rearward, extracting the spent case from the chamber and ejecting it while also re-cocking the hammer. After the slide reaches the limit of its travel, the recoil spring brings it forward again, stripping a new round from the magazine and pushing it into the chamber. This also pushes the chamber and barrel forward. The cam slot and bar move the chamber upward and the locking lugs on the barrel re-engage those in the slide.

Design flaws
The pistol has a tendency to "bite" the web of the shooter's hand, between the thumb and forefinger. This bite is caused by pressure from the hammer spur, or alternatively by pinching between the hammer shank and grip tang. This problem can be fixed by altering or replacing the hammer, or by learning to hold the pistol to avoid injury. While a common complaint with the commercial models with spur hammers similar to that of the Colt "Government Model" automatic, it is seldom a problem with the military models, which have a smaller, rounded "burr" hammer, more like that of the Colt "Commander" compact version of the 1911. Another flaw is that the original small safety is very hard to release and re-engage. This is because when cocked, the shaft the safety turns on is under hammer spring pressure. Later versions went to a larger safety to address this issue.

Variants
Genuine Browning Hi-Power P-35s were manufactured until 2017 by FN Herstal of Belgium and Portugal and under licence by Fabricaciones Militares (FM) of Argentina. The Hi-Power remains one of the most influential pistols in the history of small arms. It has inspired a number of clone manufacturers (including Charles Daly of the Philippines & the US, FEG of Hungary, Arcus of Bulgaria, IMI of Israel, and others). Many modern pistols borrow features from it, such as the staggered column high-capacity magazine and the Browning linkless cam locking system (which on modern pistols is often simplified so that the barrel locks into the ejection port, meaning the barrel and slide do not have to be machined for locking lugs). Until recently, FEG made an almost exact clone in 9mm and .40 S&W, but the company now manufactures a version with modifications to the barrel, linkage, and slide stop that are incompatible with genuine Hi-Powers. Arcus has also superseded its Arcus 94 Hi-Power clone with the Arcus 98DA, a model that draws heavily from the Hi-Power but is capable of double-action operation.

 The original P35, as noted earlier, featured an internal extractor. During World War II, it was manufactured by Inglis of Canada for Allied use, and by FN in occupied Belgium for German use. The P35s made under Nazi occupation were designated as the Pistole 640b. Most Canadian P35s were manufactured with a parkerized finish, while most P35s manufactured in occupied Belgium had a blued finish. In 1962 the internal extractor was replaced with a more durable and reliable external extractor alongside other modifications, including a 2-piece barrel and modifications to the locking system for improved durability. Later barrels and frames are not interchangeable with earlier ones.
 The L9A1 was the British designation for the military version of the post-1962 Hi-Power, and is marked 'Pistol Automatic L9A1' on the left side of the slide. It started to replace Inglis variants in British service from the late 1960s, and the two types remained in service together until the Inglis variants were finally retired in the late 1980s. The L9A1 was upgraded with the more ergonomic Mk2 ambidextrous safety and grips. The L9A1 was also widely used by other Commonwealth armed forces. The Hi-Power was the pistol issued to the British Special Air Service throughout the Cold War era. It was phased out in 2013 and replaced with the Glock 17.
 The Mark I is among the best-known models of the P35 developed over the last 50 years. P35s were first imported into the US in 1954 – the US civilian market P35s had the 'Browning Arms Company' stamp on the left side of the slide (to meet the import requirement for US sales under ATF Section 478.112). These P35s lack the provision of the lanyard ring – the left side pistol grip for a Mark I is fully covered unlike those produced for military and law enforcement use. A wide variety of options and features are available on the P35 models. Recently, Hi-Power pistols have become available in the .40 S&W and .357 SIG loadings. The use of these calibres in guns designed and built for 9×19mm Parabellum has created cases of broken or warped frames. Only Hi-Powers specifically built for these rounds should be used to fire them. The pistols manufactured for these two rounds are easily identified by examining the left side of the slide – a groove is machined into the side of the heavier slide to allow clearance for the slide release. Genuine FN-produced P35s (either FN (Europe/international) or Browning (USA) for the civilian market will have a 245-prefix serial number. Some Hi-Power variants (Type 65, Type 73) incorporate production changes e.g. spur hammers (commonly seen for 1971–present civilian market P35s) and/or 2-piece barrels (1965–present). The 'Type 73' variant (with an elongated barrel bushing) of the Mark I was produced into the late 1980s (to 1987) by FM Argentina when Mark II production commenced in the early-mid-1980s (Belgium).
 The Pistol, Browning FN 9mm, HP No. 2 MK.1/1 Canadian Lightweight Pattern was a series of experimental aluminum/aluminum alloy framed Browning Hi-Power pistols by the Canadian Inglis Company that reduced the weight by as much as 25% (8.5 oz lighter to 25.5 oz). Two scalloped cuts were made on both sides of the steel slide as well as in front of the rear sight. The reception to this was positive and so six prototype frames were machined from solid aluminum and two were sent to each of the Canadian, American, and British governments for testing. The Canadian and British governments concluded that sand and dirt caught between the steel slide and aluminum frame substantially increased wear. The steel locking block also wore the holes in its aluminum frame. After testing, Inglis cast 29 frames, assembled 21 pistols, and tested them, which were met with various problems. The lightweight program was ended in Canada in 1951. In 1952, a US Major General Kessels requested one and took it with him in the Korean War.
 The Mark I Lightweight is a very rare variant of the Mark I made with a lightweight alloy frame originally intended for paratroop use. According to Massad Ayoob, these were introduced commercially in the 1950s but never caught on. The Lightweights are marked only with Fabrique Nationale's rollmarks, not Browning's.
 Mark II is an upgraded model of the original Hi-Power introduced in the early '80s. Some of the upgrades were ambidextrous thumb safeties, nylon grips, 3-dot sights, and a throated barrel.

 Mark III was another advancement over the Mark II released in 1988, which featured a firing pin safety and a black epoxy finish. The main distinguishing (visual) feature of the Mark III is the absence of the water drain hole below the muzzle on the forward face of the slide.
 Standard is the name given to the Mark III variant with walnut grips, gloss finish, and choice of sights. A Standard is a Mark III model, but a Mark III is not necessarily a Standard.
 The Silver Chrome featured a silver-chrome frame and slide, and Pachmayr rubber grips. The magazines for the silver chrome BHP had a dull finish and a black rubber Pachmayr basepad.
 The Capitan is a Mark III variant that features adjustable tangent rear sights, a "ring hammer" like the early model HP35, checkered walnut grips, and a blued finish. It was reintroduced in 1993.
 The Practical is a Mark III variant featuring a slide finished in black polymer with a contrasting silver-chrome frame. In addition, this model has wraparound Pachmayr rubber grips and a "ring hammer". The Practical has fixed or adjustable sights, and is available in either 9 mm or .40 S&W. Magazines for all Practical models sport Pachmayr base pads; magazines feature a cartridge capacity of 13 rounds in 9 mm and a cartridge capacity of 10 rounds in .40 S&W.
 The HP-SFS (Safe-Fast-Shooting) is the latest Hi-Power Mark III variant with a modified firing mechanism. After the weapon is loaded, the hammer is pushed forward, which automatically activates the safety catch. When the shooter is prepared to fire, the safety is pressed down with the thumb, releasing the hammer to spring backwards into the usual, single-action position. A similar system is available for modifying Colt M1911A1s. Magazines are interchangeable with the Mark III and others.
 The BDA and BDAO models were first produced in the 1980s by FN. The BDA model is double-action, and the BDAO model is "double-action only", both versions differing from the usual single-action operation of the P35. These designs have also been marketed as the FN HP-DA and Browning BDA. The DA and DAO models retain many features of the P35, and both are available in full-sized and compact versions. The performance of these models is consistent with FN's high standards. These models resemble the P35, but the most distinguishing feature is the extended SIG Sauer-style trigger guard. Many parts are interchangeable with the P35, but the magazines (although similar) are not. The compact versions also utilise shorter magazines.
 The Browning BDM Model is sometimes erroneously attributed as a special model of the Hi-Power family of pistols. This is a unique pistol design only bearing an external similarity to the Hi-Power. The BDM was produced during the 1990s in North America by Browning Arms Company, and not by FN. The Browning BDM (Browning Double Mode) pistol incorporates many features of the BDA model. It can be switched from double-action/single-action mode to "revolver" mode (Double-Action Only) by the flip of a slide-mounted switch (this requires the use of a flathead screwdriver or a coin, as the switch doesn't have a tang).
 Both the DA/DAO models and the BDM model borrow features from the SIG P220 pistols marketed under the name Browning Double Action (BDA) in the 1970s. The Beretta Cheetah has also been marketed by Browning under the name BDA 380.
 Pistol Auto 9mm 1A is manufactured in India by the Ordnance Factories Board at Rifle Factory Ishapore. It is a licensed copy of the Canadian Inglis 9mm pistol with a matte black finish and black plastic grips.

 The Detective is a short-slide HP produced by FM. The Detective slide group was also available without the frame, and is interchangeable with other FM and FN Hi-Power P35s. The pistol and slide group have not been available for North American sales since the late 2000s, but can be found in resale outlets.
 The Rosario, FM90, and FM95 models are manufactured by FM. The Rosario is an almost exact copy of the Mark II intended for Argentine and Latin American sales. The FM90 was an export model based on the Mark II, but with a "Colt style" slide without the characteristic bevelled front end, first made in 1990. Rubberized pistol grips (similar to the Pachmayr grips used for P35s) with finger grooves were used in place of the traditional slab side wood grips. The FM95 was the current export model (until 2002) based on the Mark III, also with the "Colt style" slide. The last models, until 2010, are the M02 AR (modernised version of the M95, with a new single-action system by Fabrique nationale) and the M03 AR (not dated 2003, as it would seem, actually a .40 S&W version of M02 AR) with their Detective versions.
 Fabricaciones Militares of Argentina has also developed a double-action pistol, not using the HP DA system.
 The Arcus 94 is a single-action semi-automatic pistol manufactured by Arcus of Bulgaria as an unlicensed clone. There is a compact version, the Arcus 94C. It has been succeeded in production by the double-action Arcus 98DA.
On 25 October 2021, Springfield Armory launched a reproduction of the Hi-Power called the SA-35. It has the features of the original Hi-Power, but has a capacity of 15 rounds while the pistol can handle +P 9 mm Luger loads.
On 18 January 2022, FN America re-introduced a new model of Hi-Power called the FN High Power. The new pistol features a 17+1 magazine capacity and various ergonomic changes to improve user handling.

Users

 : Made under license and used by the military and police. The army use the M95 and M02AR.
 : Mark III currently the general-issue pistol for the Australian Defence Force, to be replaced with the SIG Sauer P320.
 
 
 
 
 : Adopted by the Belgian Army in 1935. Belgian Army now uses the FN Five-seveN.
 
 
 
 
 
 
 
 : Canadian Forces use pistols made by the John Inglis Co. of Ontario, Canada as their primary service pistol. It will be replaced by the SIG Sauer P320 starting in mid-2023.
 
 
 : Used pistols made by the John Inglis Co. of Ontario, Canada.
 : Unlicensed copies were produced by Norinco.
 
 : 9.000 supplied by Argentina during the Yugoslav wars
 
 
 
  - designated m/46
 
 
 
 
 : 2,400 Pistols imported from Belgium in 1939–1940, used during last stages of Winter War, common usage during Continuation War, mostly issued to pilots. Retired in 1980s.
 : Used by Gendarmerie Nationale and French Air Force during first Indochina war and Algerian war.
 
 : Used pistols made by the John Inglis Co. of Ontario, Canada.
 

 : Used by the Royal Hong Kong Regiment.
 : Identical copy was produced.
 : Produced locally as Pistol Auto 9mm 1A by Indian Ordnance Factory/Ishapore Arms using stamping dies from the former John Inglis manufacturing facility in Toronto, Ontario, Canada.
 : General-issue sidearm for Indonesian Armed Forces, especially by Komando Pasukan Katak (Kopaska) naval tactical diver group and Komando Pasukan Khusus (Kopassus) army special forces group. Made under license by Pindad as the P1.
 : Used by Iranian Navy special forces.
 
 : Used by the Irish Defence Forces, since replaced by the Heckler & Koch USP.
 : Used by YAMAM before being replaced by various Glock models. Produced locally.
 : Issued to officers of the Jamaica Defence Force.
 
 
 
 
 
 
 
 : Replaced by Glock 17.
 
 : General-issue sidearm for senior-rank officers and special forces of the military and police. 	
 : People's Movement for the Liberation of Azawad
 
: Known in Tatmadaw service as the MA-5 MK-I.
: Used by Namibian Police Force (NAMPOL)
: Over 300,000 pistols were made for the Wehrmacht after the FN factory was seized by Germany. Pistols were designated the Pistole 640(b).
: Canadian-made examples known to be used by North Korean special forces.

: replaced by the Sig Sauer P226
: Produced under license by the Defence Industries Corporation of Nigeria

: Used by Special Service Group Navy.

: Supplied by Australia.

 Formerly used by Polish special forces (JW GROM), no longer in use.
: Since 1935, by the gendarmerie Republican National Guard.

: Used by the South African Special Forces Brigade

: Used by the Royal Thai Air Force.

: Used by General Directorate of Security

: Used in limited numbers by British airborne and commando units as well as the Special Operations Executive during the Second World War. Formally adopted by the British Army as the L9, a replacement for Webley and Enfield revolvers in 1954 and by the Northern Ireland Security Guard Service in 1998.. Replaced by the Glock 17 Gen 4.
: Used by the FBI Hostage Rescue Team, and standard military issue to SOG during the Vietnam War.
: To be replaced by Glock 17

: A small quantity, brought into the country by the Australian Army during the Vietnam War, can still be found at Vietnam People's Army's shooting ranges.

References

External links

 Official page
 HiPowers and Handguns
 F.N. mod. G.P. (Grande Puissance) pictures 
 History and Disassembly Instructions for the Browning Hi-Power
 Browning Hi-Power prototypes
 FN Hi-Power Manual

.40 S&W semi-automatic pistols
9mm Parabellum semi-automatic pistols
7.65×21mm Parabellum semi-automatic pistols
FN Herstal firearms
Firearms by John Browning
Police weapons
Semi-automatic pistols of Belgium
Semi-automatic pistols of the United States
World War II infantry weapons
Weapons of the Philippine Army
Cold War weapons of the United Kingdom
Short recoil firearms
Military equipment introduced in the 1930s